Jack Howard Silver (23 April 1942 – 22 December 2016) was a set theorist and logician at the University of California, Berkeley.

Born in Montana, he earned his Ph.D. in Mathematics at Berkeley in 1966 under Robert Vaught before taking a position at the same institution the following year. He held an Alfred P. Sloan Research Fellowship from 1970 to 1972. Silver made several contributions to set theory in the areas of large cardinals and the constructible universe L.

Contributions 

In his 1975 paper "On the Singular Cardinals Problem", Silver proved that if a cardinal κ is singular with uncountable cofinality and 2λ = λ+ for all infinite cardinals λ < κ, then 2κ = κ+. Prior to Silver's proof, many mathematicians believed that a forcing argument would yield that the negation of the theorem is consistent with ZFC. He introduced the notion of a master condition, which became an important tool in forcing proofs involving large cardinals.

Silver proved the consistency of Chang's conjecture using the Silver collapse (which is a variation of the Levy collapse). He proved that, assuming the consistency of a supercompact cardinal, it is possible to construct a model where 2κ=κ++ holds for some measurable cardinal κ. With the introduction of the so-called Silver machines he was able to give a fine structure free proof of Jensen's covering lemma. He is also credited with discovering Silver indiscernibles and generalizing the notion of a Kurepa tree (called Silver's Principle). He discovered 0# ("zero sharp") in his 1966 Ph.D. thesis, discussed in the graduate textbook Set Theory: An Introduction to Large Cardinals by Frank R. Drake.

Silver's original work involving large cardinals was perhaps motivated by the goal of showing the inconsistency of an uncountable measurable cardinal; instead he was led to discover indiscernibles in L assuming a measurable cardinal exists.

Selected publications 
 
Silver, Jack H. (1971). "Some applications of model theory in set theory". Annals of Mathematical Logic 3(1), pp. 45–110.
Silver, Jack H. (1973). "The bearing of large cardinals on constructibility". In Studies in Model Theory, MAA Studies in Mathematics 8, pp. 158–182.
Silver, Jack H. (1974). "Indecomposable ultrafilters and 0#". In Proceedings of the Tarski Symposium, Proceedings of Symposia in Pure Mathematics XXV, pp. 357–363.
Silver, Jack (1975). "On the singular cardinals problem". In Proceedings of the International Congress of Mathematicians 1, pp. 265–268.
Silver, Jack H. (1980). "Counting the number of equivalence classes of Borel and coanalytic equivalence relations". Annals of Mathematical Logic 18(1), pp. 1–28.

References

External links
 Jack Silver at Berkeley

1942 births
2016 deaths
20th-century American mathematicians
21st-century American mathematicians
American logicians
Set theorists
University of California, Berkeley alumni
University of California, Berkeley faculty